The Knockout Stage of the 2007 FIFA Women's World Cup was composed of Brazil, China, Norway, Australia, North Korea, United States, England, and defending champions Germany. All the group winners, Germany, Norway and the United States made it to the Semifinals. Both semi-finals were lopsided victories as Germany beat Norway 3–0 and Brazil shocked the United States 4–0.

The knockout stage comprised the sixteen teams that advanced from the group stage of the tournament. There were three rounds of matches, with each round eliminating half of the teams entering that round. The successive rounds were the quarter-finals, semi-finals, and the final. There was also a play-off to decide third and fourth place. For each game in the knockout stage, any draw at 90 minutes was followed by thirty minutes of extra time; if scores were still level, there was a penalty shootout to determine who progressed to the next round. FIFA did abolish the golden goal rule in 2005.

Bracket

Quarter-finals

Germany vs North Korea

United States vs England

Norway vs China PR

Brazil vs Australia

Semi-finals

Germany vs Norway

United States vs Brazil

Third place play-off

Final

References 

knockout
2007
Knock
knock
Brazil at the 2007 FIFA Women's World Cup
knock
2007 in North Korean football
Knock
Knock
2007 in Chinese football